Chad Kilgore (born August 8, 1989) is a former American football linebacker. He played college football at Northwest Missouri State University and attended Excelsior Springs High School in Excelsior Springs, Missouri. He was a member of the Oakland Raiders, Sacramento Mountain Lions, Saskatchewan Roughriders and Kansas City Chiefs.

Early years
Kilgore played high school football for the Excelsior Springs High School Tigers. He was a first-team all-state linebacker, first-team all-district and all-conference linebacker and running back. He was also a team captain for the Tigers. He earned all-state, all-district and all-conference honors as a linebacker in 2006.

College career
Kilgore played football for the Northwest Missouri State Bearcats. He was named defensive MVP of the Bearcats as a junior. Kilgore was named First-team All-MIAA as a sophomore. He was also named Redshirt Freshman of the Year. He finished his college career with 392 tackles, 21.5 tackles for loss, 21 pass knockdowns, five forced fumbles, five interceptions, and 5.5 quarterback sacks.

Professional career

Oakland Raiders
Kilgore was signed by the Oakland Raiders of the National Football League (NFL) on July 29, 2012 after going undrafted in the 2012 NFL Draft. He was released by the Raiders on August 31, 2012.

Sacramento Mountain Lions
Kilgore spent the 2012 season with the Sacramento Mountain Lions of the United Football League. The 2012 season was halted early due to league financial difficulties, and Kilgore said it was obvious that there were money problems with the league. He said that the "whole demeanor of the team was, 'This is a joke.'"

Kansas City Chiefs
Kilgore signed with the Saskatchewan Roughriders of the Canadian Football League (CFL) in December 2012. He was signed by the NFL's Kansas City Chiefs on March 27, 2013. He approached Saskatchewan leadership about getting out of his contract. Kilgore said they "were extremely cool about it" and indicated that the Roughriders would like to have him rejoin the team if he did not succeed in the NFL.

He was released by the Chiefs on August 14, 2013. Upon his release, Kilgore was described as a longshot to make the roster. He was waived in order to clear roster space for cornerback Kennard Cox.

Saskatchewan Roughriders
Kilgore signed with the Saskatchewan Roughriders on March 6, 2014. He suffered a broken thumb in a June 2014 preseason game and the team placed him on the six-game injured list. He was released by the Roughriders on August 7, 2015.

References

External links
Just Sports Stats
Saskatchewan Roughriders bio 
NFL Draft Scout

Living people
1989 births
American football linebackers
Canadian football linebackers
American players of Canadian football
Northwest Missouri State Bearcats football players
Oakland Raiders players
Sacramento Mountain Lions players
Saskatchewan Roughriders players
Kansas City Chiefs players
Players of American football from Missouri
People from Ray County, Missouri